Blankenberg (Sieg) station is a through station in the town of Hennef in the German state of North Rhine-Westphalia. The station was opened in 1860/61 on a section of the Sieg Railway, opened by the Cologne-Minden Railway Company (CME) between Hennef (Sieg) and Eitorf on 1 August 1860. It has two platform tracks and is classified by Deutsche Bahn as a category 6 station.

The station is served by Rhine-Ruhr S-Bahn line S12 between Düren and Au (Sieg) hourly. Seven services each way of S19 start or finish in Blankenberg in the peaks. Other S19 services starting or finishing in Herchen or Au pass through without stopping.

Notes

Rhine-Ruhr S-Bahn stations
S12 (Rhine-Ruhr S-Bahn)
Railway stations in Germany opened in 1860
Buildings and structures in Rhein-Sieg-Kreis